Lorens Marmstedt, né Sigfrid Lorens Eriksson (29 October 1908 – 4 April 1966) was a Swedish film producer. He produced more than 50 films between 1932 and 1965.

Selected filmography 

 The Love Express (1932)
 A Stolen Waltz (1932)
 Perhaps a Poet (1933)
 Eva Goes Aboard (1934)
 The Atlantic Adventure (1934)
 The Marriage Game (1935)
 Shipwrecked Max (1936)
 The Girls of Uppakra (1936)
 The Two of Us (1939)
 Between Us Barons (1939)
 The Bjorck Family (1940)
 A Crime (1940)
 Life Goes On (1941)
 Woman on Board (1941)
 Sonja (1943)
 The Sixth Shot (1943)
 Imprisoned Women (1943)
 His Excellency (1944)
 We Need Each Other (1944)
 The Girl and the Devil (1944)
 Crime and Punishment (1945)
 It Rains on Our Love (1946)
 Interlude (1946)
 A Ship to India (1947)
 Dinner for Two (1947)
 Music in Darkness (1948)
 Prison (1949)
 Girl with Hyacinths (1950)
 The Yellow Squadron (1954)
 Whoops! (1955)
 Stage Entrance (1956)
 A Lion in Town (1959)
 Summer and Sinners (1960)
 The Cats (1965)
 Nightmare (1965)
 Woman of Darkness (1966)
 Ormen (1966)

References

External links 
 
 

1908 births
1966 deaths
Businesspeople from Stockholm
Producers who won the Best Film Guldbagge Award
Swedish film directors
Swedish film producers